Torrid or torridness usually refers to extremely hot weather. It can also refer to:

Torrid (clothing retailer), American women's retail chain 
Torrid Zone, a 1940 adventure film
Torrid Noon, a 1966 Bulgarian film
"A Torrid Love Affair", a track on a Boys Night Out album